is a JR Hokkaido  railway station in Kushiro, Hokkaidō. It is the junction of Nemuro Main Line and Senmō Main Line.

Adjacent stations

Railway stations in Hokkaido Prefecture
Railway stations in Japan opened in 1925